Nero Burning ROM, commonly called Nero, is an optical disc authoring program from Nero AG. The software is part of the Nero Multimedia Suite but is also available as a stand-alone product. It is used for burning and copying optical discs such as CDs, DVDs, Blu-rays. The program also supports label printing technologies LightScribe and LabelFlash and can be used to convert audio files into other audio formats.

Name
Nero Burning ROM is a pun in reference to Roman Emperor Nero, who was best known for his association in the Great Fire of Rome. The emperor allegedly fiddled while the city of Rome burned. Also, Rome in German is spelled Rom. The software's logo features a burning Colosseum, although this is an anachronism as it was not built until after Nero's death.

Features

Nero Burning ROM is only available for Microsoft Windows. A Linux-compatible version was available from 2005 to 2012, but it has since been discontinued. In newer versions, media can be added to compilations via the Nero MediaBrowser. Nero AirBurn, a new feature in Nero 2015, enables users to burn media straight from their mobile devices. The latest version is Nero Burning ROM 2017 released in October 2016 including  4.0 with 256-bit encryption.

The software supports the creation of a variety of media formats:
 Disk image files
 Audio CD discs
 DVD-Video discs
 Blu-ray Discs
 AVCHD video discs
 Bootable data discs
 ISO/UDF data discs
  discs

Additional functions include:
 Printing on discs with LightScribe and LabelFlash technology
 Erasing rewritable discs
 Copying audio CD tracks in a choice of audio formats onto a hard disk drive 
 Converting audio files to other audio file formats
 Connection to the online music database Gracenote

Image format support
Nero Burning ROM works with a number of optical disc image formats, including the raw uncompressed image using the ISO9660 standard and Nero's proprietary NRG file format. Depending on the version, additional image formats may be supported. To use non-natively supported formats such as lossless FLAC, Wavpack, and Shorten, additional program modules must be installed. The modules are also known as plug-ins and codecs and are usually free, although Nero AG sells some proprietary video and audio plug-ins. Standard CD images created by Nero products have the filename extension .NRG, but users can also create and burn normal ISO images.

Varieties
Nero Burning ROM is integrated in the Nero Multimedia Suite and is also available as a downloadable standalone product. It is also a part of Nero Essentials – a slimmed-down version of Nero Multimedia Suite – that comes bundled with OEM computers and optical disc writers.

Version history

Nero Burning ROM

Note: Although Nero AG appears to no longer maintain a history of older versions on their website, release notes are archived by several third-party sites.

Nero Linux

See also
InCD – drag and drop packet-writing software from Nero AG
Nero Digital –  a suite of MPEG-4 codecs developed by Nero AG
List of optical disc authoring software

References

External links
Official website

1997 software
Optical disc authoring software
Shareware
Windows CD/DVD writing software
Linux CD/DVD writing software